MV Fundy Rose is a RORO passenger ship owned by the Government of Canada, which entered service with Bay Ferries in 2015 between Saint John, New Brunswick, and Digby, Nova Scotia, replacing the MV Princess of Acadia.  The vessel was formerly owned by Attica Group based in Athens, Greece, and was operated under the name Blue Star Ithaki by their subsidiary company Blue Star Ferries under the Greek flag.

History

Greek service
Blue Star Ithaki was ordered by Greek shipowner Strintzis Lines from Daewoo Shipbuilding & Marine Engineering.  Her keel was laid on 15 July 1999 at Daewoo's Okpo shipyard, she was launched on 24 November, and was handed over to her owners on 31 March 2000, though construction work continued until May.  While she was under construction, Attica Group acquired Strintzis Lines and launched the Blue Star Ferries brand, under which name Blue Star Ithaki entered service. She was homeported in Piraeus, Greece, and operated on routes from Piraeus to the islands of Syros, Tinos and Mykonos.

Canadian service
In October 2014, Blue Star Ithaki was sold to the Canadian government.  The ship has replaced Bay Ferries' former ferry, Princess of Acadia.  Blue Star Ithaki began her last journey on the Piraeus-Syros-Tinos-Mykonos route on 25 October 2014.  The vessel's new name Fundy Rose was announced in May 2015. Fundy Rose was unveiled to the public in both Saint John and Digby in mid-July 2015, and entered service by the end of the month.

The new name was taken from The Bay of Fundy, where she operates, and from Rose Fortune, a woman born into slavery in the U.S. She escaped with her family arriving in Annapolis Royal (an historic village close to Digby) in the 1780s as a ten-year-old girl.

Design
Fundy Rose measures 10,193 GT and has been configured during her career to have a deadweight tonnage of between 1,410 and 1,857 DWT. In Greek service she had a passenger capacity of about 1,500; as configured for Canadian service she can carry 1,317 passengers.

References

Merchant ships of Canada
Daewoo
Ferries of Nova Scotia
Ferries of New Brunswick
1999 ships
Ships built by Daewoo Shipbuilding & Marine Engineering
Transport in Digby County, Nova Scotia
Transport in Saint John, New Brunswick
Ships of Blue Star Ferries